Lysgård is a small Danish village with a population of 101 (1 January 2010). It is located 15 km south from Viborg near Dollerup Hills in central Jutland.

References

Villages in Denmark
Populated places in Central Denmark Region
Viborg Municipality